Minsk Arena is the main indoor arena in Minsk, Belarus. The Minsk-Arena complex includes the arena (hosting 15,000 spectators), a cycling track (hosting 2,000 spectators), and a skating stadium (3,000 spectators).

Entertainment 
It was the host venue for the Junior Eurovision Song Contest 2010 and 2018.

Several notable people have performed in the arena. Colombian singer Shakira performed during her The Sun Comes Out World Tour on 19 May 2011. Jennifer Lopez performed during her Dance Again World Tour on 25 September 2012. Armin Van Buuren performed on 7 March 2013 as part of a celebration to commemorate 600 episodes of A State of Trance. Lana Del Rey performed during her Paradise Tour on 12 June 2013. Depeche Mode performed on 29 July 2013 and on 28 February 2014 during their Delta Machine Tour. They performed again on 13 February 2018 for their Global Spirit Tour. French singer Mylène Farmer performed on 27 October 2013. Comedian Rolilney Biong performed on 19 October 2019 during his European Tour.

Sports 

One of the primary uses of the facility is ice hockey, as the building is the home rink of HC Dinamo Minsk of the Kontinental Hockey League. The arena's official opening was held on 30 January 2010 when the 2nd Kontinental Hockey League All-Star Game was held there. However, the first match in the facility had already been played by Dinamo Minsk on 14 January 2010 against Metallurg Magnitogorsk. It was one of two main venues for the 2014 IIHF World Championship.

In January 2016, the 2016 European Speed Skating Championships were held. In January 2016, the venue hosted the tournament eSports Starladder i-League Season 13, which included games such as Dota 2 and Counter-Strike: Global Offensive.

See also
 List of European ice hockey arenas

References

External links

  
 Announcement of new arena

2010 establishments in Belarus
Basketball venues in Belarus
Buildings and structures in Minsk
HC Dinamo Minsk
Ice hockey venues in Belarus
Indoor arenas in Belarus
Indoor speed skating venues
Kontinental Hockey League venues
Speed skating venues
Sport in Minsk
Sports venues completed in 2010
Velodromes in Belarus